Ebon Airport is a public use airstrip at Ebon on Ebon Atoll, Marshall Islands. This airstrip is assigned the location identifier EBO by the IATA.

Facilities 
Ebon Airport has one runway measuring 2,650 ft (808 m).

Airlines and destinations

References 

Airports in the Marshall Islands